LaDawn Blackett Jones (born May 28, 1980) is an American lawyer and politician.

Early year and education
She was born LaDawn Blackett on May 28, 1980 in Houston, Texas to Wayne and Bonnie Blackett. In 1985, when she was five, her family moved to Atlanta, Georgia, where she attended St. Anthony's Catholic School. She later attended Osborne High School in Cobb County before ultimately graduating from Westlake High School in Fulton County. In 1998, she enrolled in Tennessee State University, graduating in 2002, cum laude, with a B.A. in English. She subsequently enrolled in Tulane University Law School. While at Tulane, Jones created a diversity program that was nominated for an American Bar Association Community Service award.

Law career
After passing the bar exam, Jones obtained a position with the Fulton County District Attorney's office, as an assistant district attorney. She was subsequently promoted to Chief Senior Assistant District Attorney, and Community Prosecutor for Zone 4 in southwest Atlanta. After 18 months in the unit, Jones was designated as the units first Director. The unit placed prosecutors throughout the county, by opening four new offices.

Political service
In 2012 Jones was elected to the Georgia House of Representatives, and served two terms from 2013 to 2017, representing a portion of Fulton County as a member of the Democratic party.

References

External links
LaDawn Jones-website

1980 births
Living people
Politicians from Houston
Businesspeople from Atlanta
Politicians from Atlanta
University of Tennessee alumni
Tulane University Law School alumni
Georgia (U.S. state) lawyers
Lawyers from Houston
Women state legislators in Georgia (U.S. state)
Democratic Party members of the Georgia House of Representatives
African-American state legislators in Georgia (U.S. state)
21st-century African-American people
21st-century African-American women
20th-century African-American people
20th-century African-American women